The  Secular Progressive Front was a political alliance in Manipur, India, which formed before the 2002 Manipur Legislative Assembly election and ruled Manipur from 2002 until 2012, when the alliance was broken.

Front members
The political parties of the alliance were:

Background and electoral performance

Formation and 2002 assembly election
In 2002 Manipur Legislative Assembly election, it was resulted hung assembly with INC winning 20 seats, FPP winning 13 seats, MSCP winning 7 seats, CPI 5 seats, BJP 4 seats, NCP 3 seats and others 8 seats. SPF was formed on March 1, 2002 and it urged the Governor Ved Marwah to invite them to form the Government with a list of 33 supporting MLAs. On March 7, 2002, first SPF Government was created. Along with chief minister Okram Ibobi Singh from INC, ministers were sworn in including Govindas Konthoujam of MSCP, Pheiroijam Parijat Singh of CPI and Chungkhokai Doungel of NCP. DRPP with 2 MLAs joined SPF afterwards. MLAs from NCP, MSCP DRPP and Samata Party defected to INC making their strength 33 in the assembly.

2007 assembly election
In the 2007 Manipur Legislative Assembly election, Congress and CPI were not allied. But they formed the Government together as SPF along with NCP. In the election, INC won 30 seats, CPI 4, NCP 5 and MSCP 0 seats. On March 1, 2007, Congress and CPI jointly held the SPF Steering Committee Meeting, where 3 MLAs of RJD, 3 MLAs of NPP and 3 Independent MLAs supported SPF Government on March 2, 2007.

Dissolution
In the 2012 Manipur Legislative Assembly election, INC contested on its own, dissolving the front. CPI contested on 24 seats. In the election INC won absolute majority of its own with 42 MLAs and CPI having no representatives in the assembly.

See also
Secular Progressive Front
Manipur Progressive Secular Alliance
Left and Democratic Front
Left and Secular Alliance

References

Defunct political party alliances in India
Defunct political parties in Manipur
2002 establishments in Manipur
2012 disestablishments in India